Ceremony for the 28th Hong Kong Film Awards was held on 19 April 2009 in the Hong Kong Cultural Centre and hosted by Eric Tsang, Teresa Mo, Sandra Ng, Vincent Kok, Kay Tse, Denise Ho, Lam Chi Chung, Chin Kar-lok, Louis Fan, Tin Kai Man, Michelle Lo and Wong Cho Lam.

Awards
Winners are listed first, highlighted in boldface, and indicated with a double dagger.

References

External links
 Official website of the Hong Kong Film Awards

2009
2008 film awards
2009 in Hong Kong
2009 in Chinese cinema